Ofena is a comune and town in the Province of L'Aquila in the Abruzzo region of Italy. It is located in the natural park known as the "Gran Sasso e Monti della Laga National Park". The comune/village is home to a vast and rich history of a community that has existed for many hundreds of years.

History 

A letter of Pope Simplicius dated 19 November 475 speaks of a Bishop Gaudentius of Aufinium, the Latin name by which the town was known, against whom three neighbouring bishops had laid complaints.

No longer a residential bishopric, Aufinium is today listed by the Catholic Church as a titular see.

References

Cities and towns in Abruzzo